Encyocrates is a monotypic genus of African tarantulas found on Madagascar containing the single species, Encyocrates raffrayi. The female was first described by Eugène Louis Simon in 1892, and the male was described by Lucien Berland in 1917.

See also
 List of Theraphosidae species

References

Endemic fauna of Madagascar
Monotypic Theraphosidae genera
Spiders of Madagascar
Theraphosidae